The 2014 Chatham Cup was New Zealand's 87th annual knockout football competition.

The 2014 competition had five rounds proper before quarter-finals, semi-finals, and a final. The final, played on 7 September 2014, was won by Christchurch club Cashmere Technical, who beat Central United 2–1 for their second trophy in two years, the first club to go back to back since 1998. The Jack Batty Memorial Cup for man of the final was won by Cashmere Technical's Stu Kelly.

Results
All results and dates are taken from the following sources: The Ultimate New Zealand Soccer Website, RSSSF, Capital Football and Soccerway.

Preliminary round

Northern Region

Mainland Region

All teams listed below received byes to the second round.
Northern Region: Albany United, Auckland University, Beachlands Maraetai, Cambridge, Claudelands Rovers, Eastern Suburbs, Ellerslie, FC Whangarei, Fencibles United, Forrest Hill-Milford United, Hibiscus Coast, Lynn-Avon United, Mangere United, Manurewa, Melville United, Metro, Mt. Albert-Ponsonby, Ngongotaha, North Shore United, Onehunga-Mangere United, Oratia United, Otahuhu United, Otumoetai, Papakura City, Papatoetoe, Takapuna, Taradale, Tauranga City United, Te Atatu, Waiheke United, Waitemata City, Waiuku, Warkworth, Western Springs
Central/Capital Region: Brooklyn Northern United, Douglas Villa, Eastbourne, Havelock North Wanderers, Island Bay United, Marist Palmerston North, Marist Wellington, Miramar Rangers, Naenae, Napier City Rovers, North Wellington, Petone, Red Sox Manawatu, Seatoun, Stokes Valley, Stop Out, Tawa, Victoria University, Wainuiomata, Wairarapa United, Wanganui Athletic, Waterside Karori, Wellington Olympic, Wellington United, Western Suburbs
Mainland/Southern Region: Burwood, Canterbury University, Cashmere Technical, Central Pirates, Christchurch United, Coastal Spirit, Dunedin Technical, FC Nelson, Ferrymead Bays, Halswell United, Invercargill Old Boys, Invercargill Thistle, Melchester Rovers, Mosgiel, Nomads United, Northern, Northern Hearts, Otago University, Parklands United, Pleasant Point, Queens Park, Queenstown Rovers, Richmond Athletic, Selwyn United, Southend United, Waihopai, Waimakariri United, West End, Western

All teams listed below received byes to the third round.
Northern Region: Bay Olympic, Birkenhead United, Central United, East Coast Bays, Glenfield Rovers, Hamilton Wanderers, Ngaruawahia United, Onehunga Sports, Three Kings United, Waitakere City
Central/Capital Region: Lower Hutt City, Palmerston North End, Upper Hutt City
Mainland/Southern Region: Roslyn Wakari

Round 1
All results and dates are taken from the following sources: The Ultimate New Zealand Soccer Website, RSSSF, Capital Football and Soccerway.
Northern Region

Central / Capital Region

Mainland / Southern Region

Round 2
All results and dates are taken from the following sources: The Ultimate New Zealand Soccer Website, RSSSF, Capital Football and Soccerway.
Northern Region

Central / Capital Region

Mainland / Southern

Round 3
All results and dates are taken from the following sources: The Ultimate New Zealand Soccer Website, RSSSF, Capital Football, Soccerway and New Zealand Football.
Northern Region

Central / Capital

Mainland / Southern

Round 4
All results and dates are taken from the following sources: The Ultimate New Zealand Soccer Website, RSSSF, Capital Football, Soccerway and New Zealand Football.
Northern Region

Central / Capital

Mainland / Southern

Quarter-finals
All results and dates are taken from the following sources: The Ultimate New Zealand Soccer Website, RSSSF, Capital Football and Soccerway.

Semi-finals
All results and dates are taken from the following sources: The Ultimate New Zealand Soccer Website, RSSSF, Capital Football and Soccerway.

Final
Results and date are taken from the following sources: The Ultimate New Zealand Soccer Website, RSSSF, Capital Football and Soccerway.

Details

References

External links
Reply of the final

Chatham Cup
2013–14 in New Zealand association football
2015–16 in New Zealand association football
2014 domestic association football cups
September 2014 sports events in New Zealand